Ask a Silly Answer is a short-lived panel show on British television in 1977. Produced by Southern Television and hosted by Terry Wogan, there was only one series, of six episodes.

The panel comprised two teams; 
 Alfred Marks and Willie Rushton
 Graeme Garden and Spike Milligan.

Transmissions 

The series was also broadcast by Anglia television during the summer of 1977.

References

1977 British television series debuts
1977 British television series endings
1970s British game shows
ITV panel games
English-language television shows
Television shows produced by Southern Television